Dockweiler may refer to:

Geography
Dockweiler, a municipality in Rhineland-Palatinate, western Germany
Dockweiler State Beach, a beach near Los Angeles, California, USA

Surname
Dockweiler (surname)